The Spirit of Spanish Music is a sculpture by
Burt William Johnson (25 April 1890—27 March 1927).
It was commissioned by the Pomona College class of 1915 and
placed in the Lebus Court of the Mabel Shaw Bridges Hall of Music at Pomona College, one of a
group of buildings conceived for the expansion of Pomona College and built in the mid-1910s by
architect Myron Hunt using details of the "ornamental Spanish style".

This style, and the fact that the building where it stands was intended
for the study and performance of music, give the sculpture its name.
(Other names for the sculpture sometimes are seen in various sources, including 
Pastoral Flutist and Youth).

The figure itself, a boy in "classic contrapposto stance"
playing an elongated flute, was influenced by the 15th century Florentine sculptor 
Desiderio da Settignano
It reflects the overall "Arcadian" theme Hunt intended for Pomona's south campus.

The sculpture's harmony with the building surrounding its courtyard setting
was described in 1921 as "happily eloquent of the spirit of the place".
"The pose is exquisite," reports another journal of the period,
"and the design peculiarly appropriate to the Spanish architecture of the beautiful
temple of music it is to adorn."
In a lecture on the occasion of the Centennial in 2015 of the statue and the building,
art historian George Gorse labels the setting "A Pastoral Theatre", and characterizes
the sculpture as "Vergilian 'Arcadia' . . . absolutely Vergilian."

The sculpture was cast in bronze by the Gorham Company in Providence, R.I. It is life-size, 
approximately 137 cm (54 in.) in height. Before being delivered to Claremont and installed in
Lebus Court, it was exhibited by the Gorham Company at their gallery on Fifth Avenue in New York, and at the Winter Exhibition at the National Academy.

After part of the fountain collapsed, the statue was removed in early 2015 while repairs were made.
Before its return on 14 August 2015, The Spirit of Spanish Music was restored by conservator Donna Williams, including the repair of the boy's broken flute.

Gallery

See also
 Burt Johnson
 Dividing the Light, the Pomona College skyspace
 Prometheus (Ororzco), the mural in Pomona's Frary Dining Hall

References

Further reading
 Architect and Engineer, Volume LIII Number 1, April 1918, photograph on p. 60
 Claremont Colleges Digital Archive, 31 historic images

Bronze sculptures in California
Pomona College
1916 sculptures
Nude sculptures in California
Statues of musicians in the United States
Musical instruments in art